Hackney, is a village in Guyana, standing on the eastern bank of the Pomeroon River, 11 km from its mouth. Formerly the business centre for residents of the coconut estates of the lower Pomeroon River, Hackney is still of some importance.  It provides a primary school and church for residents of the surrounding area.

References

Populated places in Pomeroon-Supenaam